Nakenthana Ngairi (English: Autumn is Waiting) is a 2006 Indian Meitei language film written, produced and directed by Dinesh Tongbram. It is the first production of United Films Manipur. The film features Amarjeet Rajkumar, Huirem Seema, Kaiku Rajkumar and Devita Urikhinbam in the lead roles. It was released at Usha Cinema, Paona Bazar on 10 September 2006.

Nakenthana Ngairi was initially named as Wahangsina. The processing of the film had been done at Rupayan (Kolkata), Ramoji Film City (Hyderabad) and AGC (Lamphel). This was the first Manipuri video film converted from celluloid in the state.

Plot
Aya's and Bem's romance is disrupted by Bem's mother on the ground that Aya is from a poor family background. Despite Bem's father repeated suggestions to not interfere in their relationship, his wife continues to follow her own line of thoughts. Carving out elaborate plans, Bem's mother gets her daughter married to a rich guy Sobhas. The guy happens to be an immoral person who maintains illicit affairs with his long time girlfriend Indira even after the marriage. Pushpa (Bem's younger sister) tries to win Sanjoy's (Aya's younger brother) heart as a revenge against her mother who forcefully marries Bem without her consent. Pushpa succeeds.

Due to repeated physical and mental harassment by Sobhas, Bem becomes ill and gets hospitalised. During her stay in the hospital, her son Momocha dies. Bem becomes a mentally retarded woman. She comes back to her maternal home. There, Aya comes to take her. True love triumphs at the end.

Cast
 Amarjeet Rajkumar as Aya
 Huirem Seema as Bem
 Kaiku Rajkumar as Sanjoy, Aya's younger brother
 Devita Urikhinbam as Pushpa, Bem's younger sister
 Wangkhem Lalitkumar as IAS officer, Bem's father
 R.K. Hemabati as Bem's mother
 Khwairakpam Bishwamittra as Sobhas
 Laimayum Gayatri as Indira, Sobhas' girlfriend
 Longjam Ongbi Lalitabi as Sanjoy's mother
 Gurumayum Ongbi Gunabati as Aya's mother
 Joseph Thokchom as Munal, Aya's college mate
 Master Bolex as Momocha, Bem's son

Soundtrack
The tune and music were composed by Jiten Khaidem, Tomba Thangjam and Gopi. Manichandra, Bobi, Kemo and Yu Gandhi wrote the lyrics. Sunita Nepram, Huidrom Nowboy, Maibam Roshibina, Khun Joykumar and Pushparani Huidrom are the playback singers in the movie.

References

2006 films
Meitei-language films